Sun–Joffe Manifesto or the Joint Manifesto of Sun and Joffe (孫文越飛宣言) was an agreement signed between Sun Yat-sen and Adolph Joffe on January 26, 1923 for the cooperation of Republic of China Kuomintang and Soviet Union.  The manifesto asserted that the Soviet system was not suitable for China, and it announced in general terms the willingness of Soviet to cooperate with the KMT in its struggle to unify China at the time.

Background
In 1918 Georgy Chicherin of the Soviet Union Council of the People's Commissars announced Soviet intention to relinquish Russian rights and privileges acquired in China.  A formal note to open negotiation was sent to the Chinese Foreign Minister in Peking on October 27, 1920.  The Bolsheviks sent M.I. Yurin, Alexander Paikes and Adolph Joffe.

Signing
Adolph Joffe would not settle the question of Outer Mongolia or the Chinese Far Eastern Railway.  But he was successful in establishing a political relations with Sun Yat-sen.  On January 26, 1923 Sun and Joffe issued the manifesto.  It became the foundation of cooperation between the Kuomintang and Soviet Union.  In July 1923 Sun sent Chiang Kai-shek to Russia to study Soviet military and political conditions. At the time the Chinese Communist Party was only established in July 1921, just a year ago before the signing. Sources have pointed out that this was the most crucial decision made in Sun Yat-sen's life to align the KMT with the Soviets and CCP.

See also
 Li–Lobanov Treaty
 Chinese civil war

References

1923 in China
Political manifestos
1923 in politics
1923 documents
China–Soviet Union relations